Giovanny Martínez Cortés (born 7 July 1989) is a Colombian professional  footballer who plays as a midfielder for Rionegro Águilas.

Career

Club
Martínez left FC Ararat-Armenia on 20 June 2019 by mutual consent.

References

1989 births
Living people
Association football midfielders
Footballers from Cali
Colombian footballers
Categoría Primera A players
América de Cali footballers
FC Ararat-Armenia players
Águilas Doradas Rionegro players